South Terwillegar is a neighbourhood in southwest Edmonton, Alberta, Canada that was established in 2003 through the adoption of the South Terwillegar Neighbourhood Area Structure Plan (NASP).  

South Terwillegar is located within the Terwillegar Heights area and was initially planned under the Terwillegar Heights Servicing Concept Design Brief (SCDB). 

It is bounded on the west by Terwillegar Drive, north by the Terwillegar Towne neighbourhood, east and southeast by Rabbit Hill Road and south and southwest by Anthony Henday Drive.

Demographics 

Surrounding neighbourhoods

References 

Neighbourhoods in Edmonton